Ronald Gene Anderson (born October 15, 1958) is a retired American professional basketball player, best known for his spell with the National Basketball Association's Philadelphia 76ers. His son Ron, Jr. played for South Florida for the 2010–11 and 2011–12 seasons, after transferring from Kansas State.

College career
Listed at 6'7", and playing as a guard-forward, Anderson, after graduating from Chicago's Bowen High School, played college basketball at Fresno State, after first beginning at Santa Barbara City College.

Professional career
Anderson was selected by the Cleveland Cavaliers, in the second round of the 1984 NBA draft. Although he played the normal four years in college, and immediately started playing in the league, Anderson arrived there at age 26. He spent ten seasons (1984–1994) playing with the Cavaliers, Indiana Pacers, Philadelphia 76ers, New Jersey Nets and Washington Bullets (he split 1993–94 between these two teams, appearing for the  Continental Basketball Association's Rochester Renegade in between).

Having had his best years with the Sixers, playing alongside Charles Barkley, he scored in double figures four of the five seasons he spent in Philadelphia, with a best output of 16.2 points per game in 1988–89. Anderson finished his NBA career with totals of 7,056 points (10.6 average), 2,312 rebounds (3.5) and 952 assists (1.4). He played at a top level until the age of 41, successively representing Montpellier Basket (1994–95, 1997–99), Maccabi Tel Aviv (1995–96), Le Mans SB (1996–97) and Angers BC 49 in the French and Israeli professional leagues. He also played with the Atlantic City Seagulls during 1995–96. He was the top scorer in France's Pro A top division in 1995. Injury and a failed knee operation while playing for Maccabi slowed him down subsequently.

Anderson settled, got married and started a family in France. He continued to play semi-professionally with the basketball team of La Séguinière, helping that team win the French third division in 2003 and subsequently playing in the second French division. In 2009, Anderson was inducted into the Fresno County Athletic Hall of Fame. At age 51, he scored 23 points in a game against Tourcoing in league play of France's second division. At age 52, he announced his final retirement on November 16, 2010, with his team sending him off at a last home game on November 27, 2010.

Anderson has been a resident of Voorhees Township, New Jersey.

NBA career statistics

Regular season 

|-
| style="text-align:left;"| 
| style="text-align:left;"|Cleveland
| 36 || 7 || 14.4 || .431 || .500 || .820 || 2.4 || 0.9 || 0.3 || 0.2 || 5.8
|-
| style="text-align:left;"| 
| style="text-align:left;"|Cleveland
| 17 || 3 || 12.2 || .500 || .000 || .750 || 1.5 || 0.5 || 0.1 || 0.0 || 5.1
|-
| style="text-align:left;"| 
| style="text-align:left;"|Indiana
| 60 || 27 || 24.5 || .493 || .250 || .658 || 4.1 || 2.3 || 0.9 || 0.1 || 10.4
|-
| style="text-align:left;"| 
| style="text-align:left;"|Indiana
| 63 || 0 || 11.4 || .473 || .000 || .787 || 2.4 || 0.9 || 0.5 || 0.0 || 5.8
|-
| style="text-align:left;"| 
| style="text-align:left;"|Indiana
| 74 || 1 || 14.8 || .498 || .000 || .766 || 2.9 || 1.1 || 0.6 || 0.1 || 7.3
|-
| style="text-align:left;"| 
| style="text-align:left;"|Philadelphia
| 82 || 12 || 31.9 || .491 || .182 || .856 || 5.0 || 1.7 || 0.9 || 0.3 || 16.2
|-
| style="text-align:left;"| 
| style="text-align:left;"|Philadelphia
| 78 || 3 || 26.8 || .451 || .143 || .838 || 3.8 || 1.8 || 0.9 || 0.2 || 11.9
|-
| style="text-align:left;"| 
| style="text-align:left;"|Philadelphia
| 82 || 13 || 28.5 || .485 || .209 || .833 || 4.5 || 1.4 || 0.8 || 0.2 || 14.6
|-
| style="text-align:left;"| 
| style="text-align:left;"|Philadelphia
| 82 || 11 || 29.7 || .465 || .331 || .877 || 3.4 || 1.6 || 1.0 || 0.1 || 13.7
|-
| style="text-align:left;"| 
| style="text-align:left;"|Philadelphia
| 69 || 0 || 18.3 || .414 || .325 || .809 || 2.7 || 1.3 || 0.4 || 0.1 || 8.1
|-
| style="text-align:left;"| 
| style="text-align:left;"|New Jersey
| 11 || 2 || 16.0 || .349 || .333 || .833 || 2.4 || 0.5 || 0.5 || 0.2 || 4.0
|-
| style="text-align:left;"| 
| style="text-align:left;"|Washington
| 10 || 0 || 18.0 || .465 || .214 || .818 || 2.7 || 1.1 || 0.3 || 0.1 || 5.2
|- class="sortbottom"
| style="text-align:center;" colspan="2"| Career
| 664 || 79 || 22.8 || .471 || .287 || .814 || 3.5 || 1.4 || 0.7 || 0.1 || 10.6

Playoffs 

|-
|style="text-align:left;"|1985
|style="text-align:left;"|Cleveland
|2||0||4.5||.000||–||–||1.5||0.0||0.0||0.0||0.0
|-
|style="text-align:left;"|1987
|style="text-align:left;"|Indiana
|4||0||6.0||.500||–||–||0.8||0.0||0.0||0.0||1.0
|-
|style="text-align:left;"|1989
|style="text-align:left;"|Philadelphia
|3||0||36.3||.569||.000||.800||5.3||4.3||0.3||0.7||20.7
|-
|style="text-align:left;"|1990
|style="text-align:left;"|Philadelphia
|10||0||25.6||.430||.600||.967||3.7||1.4||0.4||0.0||11.2
|-
|style="text-align:left;"|1991
|style="text-align:left;"|Philadelphia
|8||0||27.9||.398||.200||.895||2.6||2.4||0.8||0.0||11.0
|- class="sortbottom"
| style="text-align:center;" colspan="2"| Career
| 27 || 0 || 23.0 || .444 || .364 || .926 || 3.0 || 1.7 || 0.4 || 0.1 || 9.9

References

External links 
 Stats at BasketballReference

1958 births
Living people
African-American basketball players
American expatriate basketball people in France
American expatriate basketball people in Israel
American men's basketball players
Atlantic City Seagulls players
Basketball players from Chicago
Cleveland Cavaliers draft picks
Cleveland Cavaliers players
Fresno State Bulldogs men's basketball players
Indiana Pacers players
Le Mans Sarthe Basket players
Maccabi Tel Aviv B.C. players
Montpellier Paillade Basket players
New Jersey Nets players
People from Voorhees Township, New Jersey
Philadelphia 76ers players
Rochester Renegade players
Santa Barbara City Vaqueros men's basketball players
Shooting guards
Small forwards
Washington Bullets players
21st-century African-American people
20th-century African-American sportspeople